The 2022 New Zealand Tri-Nation Series was a cricket tournament that took place in October 2022 as a preparatory series before 2022 ICC Men's T20 World Cup. It was a tri-nation series between New Zealand, Bangladesh and Pakistan, with all the matches played as Twenty20 Internationals (T20Is). On 26 June 2022, Pakistan Cricket Board confirmed their participation in the tournament. On 28 June 2022, New Zealand Cricket confirmed the fixtures with all the matches played at the Hagley Oval, Christchurch.

Squads

Bangladesh named Mahedi Hasan, Rishad Hossain, Shoriful Islam and Soumya Sarkar as standby players. Pakistan named Shahnawaz Dahani, Mohammad Haris and Fakhar Zaman as reserves. Blair Tickner was added to New Zealand's squad before the tournament. New Zealand's Daryl Mitchell was ruled of the series, after sustaining a fractured finger during practice in the nets. Dane Cleaver was named as his replacement. Lockie Ferguson was ruled out due to an abdominal injury.

Round-robin

Points table

 Advanced to the final

Fixtures

Final

References

Notes

External links
 Series home at ESPNcricinfo

2022 in New Zealand cricket
2022 in Bangladeshi cricket
2022 in Pakistani cricket
International cricket competitions in 2022–23
Bangladeshi cricket tours of New Zealand
Pakistani cricket tours of New Zealand
New Zealand Tri-Nation Series